Oktawian Samulski is a former Polish luger who competed in the late 1980s. A natural track luger, he won the gold medal in the men's doubles event at the 1991 FIL European Luge Natural Track Championships in Völs am Schlern, Italy.

References
Natural track European Championships results 1970-2006.

Polish male lugers
Year of birth missing (living people)
Living people
Place of birth missing (living people)